William Murray (1898–unknown) was an English footballer who played in the Football League for Derby County and Middlesbrough.

References

1898 births
English footballers
Association football forwards
English Football League players
Bishop Auckland F.C. players
Derby County F.C. players
Middlesbrough F.C. players
Heart of Midlothian F.C. players
Dunfermline Athletic F.C. players
Year of death missing